Schwarzschild is a large lunar impact crater, approximately  in diameter. It is located in the northern part of the Moon's far side. The nearest craters of note are Seares to the northeast, and Gamow to the southeast. It was named after German physicist and astronomer Karl Schwarzschild (1873–1916).

The somewhat irregular outer rim of Schwarzschild has been overlain by  many smaller impact craters, including most notably Schwarzschild K across the southeastern face and Schwarzschild D on the northeastern rim. The rim is roughly circular in form, with an outward bulge along the southwestern side. The rim has been softened and modified by impact erosion, particularly to the northeast. Just to the northeast of Schwarzschild K is a short chain of small craters lying across the rim and inner wall of Schwarzschild.

The inner floor of Schwarzschild is relatively level by comparison with the rugged terrain outside, and is particularly flat in the north-northeastern half. There is a region of low, irregular ridges to the west of the midpoint. Lying in the southeastern part of the floor is the satellite crater Schwarzschild L, and surrounding this interior crater is an outer rampart formed from the ejecta material during its formation.

Satellite craters 

By convention these features are identified on lunar maps by placing the letter on the side of the crater midpoint that is closest to Schwarzschild.

See also 
 Asteroid 837 Schwarzschilda

References 

 
 
 
 
 
 
 
 
 
 
 
 

Impact craters on the Moon